John Ingram may refer to:

John Ingram (engineer) (1924–2015), New Zealand engineer and businessman
John Ingram (engraver) (1721–1767 or later), English engraver
John Ingram (martyr) (1565–1594), English Jesuit and martyr
John Ingram (politician) (1929–2013), retired American Democratic politician, attorney, and insurance commissioner
John Ingram (revolutionary) (b. before 1644), leader of Bacon's Rebellion after the death of Nathaniel Bacon
Jack Ingram (ice hockey) (John Jasper Ingram, born 1957), professional ice hockey player
John Henry Ingram (1842–1916), English biographer and editor
John Kells Ingram (1823–1907), Irish poet and scholar
John Michael Ingram (1931–2014), British menswear designer and founder of Design Intelligence forecasting agency.
John R. Ingram (businessman) (born 1961/1962), American heir, businessman and philanthropist.
John W. Ingram (1929–2008), Federal Railroad Administrator of the Chicago, Rock Island and Pacific Railway, 1971–1974

See also
Jack Ingram (disambiguation)